Azizabad may refer to:

Afghanistan
 Azizabad, Herat in Afghanistan

Azerbaijan
 Əzizabad, a village in Azerbaijan

Iran

Ardabil Province
 Azizabad, Bileh Savar, a village in Bileh Savar County
 Azizabad, Khalkhal, a village in Khalkhal County

Chaharmahal and Bakhtiari Province
 Azizabad-e Olya, a village in Ardal County
 Azizabad-e Sofla, a village in Ardal County

East Azerbaijan Province
 Azizabad, East Azerbaijan, a village in Hashtrud County

Fars Province
 Azizabad, Firuzabad, a village in Firuzabad County

Golestan Province
 Azizabad, Golestan, a village in Kalaleh County

Hormozgan Province
 Azizabad, Hormozgan, a village in Rudan County

Isfahan Province
Azizabad, Isfahan, a village in Tiran and Karvan County

Kerman Province
 Azizabad-e Sheybani, a village in Anbarabad County
 Azizabad, Narmashir, a village in Narmashir County
 Azizabad, alternate name of Qaleh-ye Azizabad, a village in Narmashir County
 Azizabad Rural District, in Narmashir County
 Azizabad, Rigan, a village in Rigan County
 Azizabad, Rudbar-e Jonubi, a village in Rudbar-e Jonubi County
 Azizabad, Vahdat, a village in Zarand County

Kermanshah Province
 Azizabad, Harsin, a village in Harsin County
 Azizabad, Javanrud, a village in Javanrud County
 Azizabad, Kangavar, a village in Kangavar County
 Azizabad, Sahneh, a village in Sahneh County
 Azizabad, Dinavar, a village in Sahneh County
 Azizabad, Salas-e Babajani, a village in Salas-e Babajani County

Khuzestan Province

Kurdistan Province
Azizabad, Qaratureh, a village in Divandarreh County

Lorestan Province

Azna County
 Azizabad-e Qeytasvand, a village in Azna County

Delfan County
 Azizabad, Delfan, a village in Delfan County
 Azizabad, Kakavand, a village in Delfan County
 Azizabad, alternate name of Aziz Koshteh, a village in Delfan County
 Azizabad, alternate name of Mohammad Shahabad, a village in Delfan County
 Azizabad-e Pain, a village in Delfan County

Dorud County
 Azizabad, Dorud, a village in Dorud County

Rumeshkhan County
 Azizabad, Rumeshkhan, a village in Rumeshkhan County

Selseleh County
 Azizabad, Selseleh, a village in Selseleh County

Markazi Province
 Azizabad, Farahan, a village in Farahan County
 Azizabad, Saveh, a village in Saveh County

Mazandaran Province
 Azizabad, Mazandaran, a village in Tonekabon County

North Khorasan Province
 Azizabad, North Khorasan, a village in Maneh and Samalqan County

Razavi Khorasan Province
 Azizabad, Gonabad, a village in Gonabad County
 Azizabad, Kalat, a village in Kalat County
 Azizabad, Sabzevar, a village in Sabzevar County

Sistan and Baluchestan Province
Azizabad, Iranshahr, a village in Iranshahr County
Azizabad, Qasr-e Qand, a village in Qasr-e Qand County

South Khorasan Province
Azizabad, South Khorasan, a village in Boshruyeh County

Tehran Province
 Azizabad, Rey, a village in Rey County

Yazd Province
 Azizabad, Abarkuh, a village in Abarkuh County
 Azizabad, Bafq, a village in Bafq County

Zanjan Province
 Azizabad, Zanjan, a village in Tarom County

Pakistan
 Azizabad (Karachi), a suburb of Gulberg Town in Karachi, Sindh, Pakistan
 Azizabad (Murree), a village near Kali mitti in Punjab, Pakistan
 Azizabad (Nasirabad), a village near Dera Jamali, Balochistan, Pakistan

Other 
 Azizabad airstrike